Lemuria-Seascape is an album by pianist Kenny Barron which was recorded in early 1991 and released on the Candid label.

Reception 

In his review on AllMusic, Ron Wynn stated "The Barron/Drummond/Riley trio step forward into the '90s and churn out another impressive collection, this one containing mostly either Barron or group originals rather than tons of standards. Exacting, carefully constructed, and consistently brilliant playing all around".

Track listing 
All compositions by Kenny Barron except where noted.

 "Lemuria" – 4:36
 "Ask Me Now" (Thelonious Monk) – 5:31
 "Sweet Lorraine" (Cliff Burwell, Mitchell Parish) – 7:19
 "Fungii Mama" (Blue Mitchell) – 5:44
 "Slow Grind" – 5:19
 "Have You Met Miss Jones?" (Richard Rodgers, Lorenz Hart) – 5:11
 "Maria Isabel" (Christina Blalock) – 6:36
 "You Go to My Head" (J. Fred Coots, Haven Gillespie) – 9:01
 "The Magical Look in Your Eyes" (Rufus Reid) – 7:40
 "Seascape" – 5:31

Personnel 
Kenny Barron – piano
Ray Drummond – bass
Ben Riley – drums

References 

Kenny Barron albums
1991 albums
Candid Records albums
Albums recorded at Van Gelder Studio